Mannering is a surname. Notable people with the surname include:

Cecil Mannering, 20th century British actor
Émilie Mannering, Canadian film director
Fred Mannering, professor, Highly Cited Researcher
George Edward Mannering (1862–1947), New Zealand banker, mountaineer and writer
Julia Mannering, pseudonym of Madeleine Bingham (1912-1988)
Katherine Mannering, photographic model
Mary Mannering (1876–1953), Anglo-American actress
Sarah Mannering, Canadian film producer
Simon Mannering (born 1986), New Zealand professional rugby league player

Fictional characters:
John Mannering in The Baron TV series

See also
Guy Mannering or The Astrologer, a novel by Sir Walter Scott
Mannering Park, New South Wales, Australia
Mount Mannering, Antarctica
Mainwaring, a surname
Manwaring, a surname
Manring, a surname